Kevin Shea may refer to:

 Kevin Shea (administrator), who served as the acting U.S. Secretary of Agriculture in 2021
 Kevin Shea (jockey) (born 1963), former South African horse racing jockey
 Kevin Shea (musician) (born 1973), American jazz drummer in improvisation and experimental music